The 2004–05 Iranian Futsal 1st Division will be divided into two phases.

The league will also be composed of 16 teams divided into two divisions of 8 teams each, whose teams will be divided geographically. Teams will play only other teams in their own division, once at home and once away for a total of 14 matches each.

Teams

Group A

Group B

Play Off 

 Elmo Adab Mashhad Promoted to the Super League.

First leg

Return leg

 Fajr Ghaem Galoogah Promoted to the Super League.

First leg

Return leg

Final

See also 
 2004–05 Iranian Futsal Super League
 2004–05 Persian Gulf Cup
 2004–05 Azadegan League
 2004–05 Iran Football's 2nd Division
 2004–05 Iran Football's 3rd Division
 2004–05 Hazfi Cup
 Iranian Super Cup

References

External links 
  I.R. Iran Football Federation

Iran Futsal's 1st Division seasons
2004–05 in Iranian futsal leagues